Robert German (died 1402) was an English politician.

He was a Member (MP) of the Parliament of England for Nottingham from 1377 to 1397.

References

14th-century births
1402 deaths
English MPs January 1377
English MPs 1378
English MPs 1379
English MPs 1395
English MPs January 1380
English MPs October 1382
English MPs February 1383
English MPs November 1384
English MPs January 1390
English MPs January 1397